Desolation Peak may refer to:

 Desolation Peak (California) in California, USA
 Desolation Peak (Montana) in Montana, USA
 Desolation Peak (Washington) in Washington, USA
 Desolation Peak (Wyoming) in Wyoming, USA